KCGK (104.1 FM, "Positive Country 104.1") is a radio station licensed to Lutesville, Missouri, serving the areas of Cape Girardeau, Missouri and Marble Hill, Missouri. Owned by Pure Word Broadcasting, LLC, it broadcasts a Christian country music format.

On April 7, 2021, the station changed its call letters from KMHM to KCGK On May 4, 2021, the station dropped its Southern gospel format in favor of a Christian country music format branded as Positive Country 104.1, featuring a mixture of secular and Christian country music.

References

External links

CGK
Radio stations established in 1997
1997 establishments in Missouri
Country radio stations in the United States